Janina Leitzig (born 16 April 1999) is a German footballer who plays as a goalkeeper for Leicester City on loan from Bayern Munich.

Career
Leitzig was born in 1999. She has played for German national teams for under 17s and under 20s. She played for TSG 1899 Hoffenheim II until 2021 when she was signed for the season by Bayern Munich. In January 2023, she joined English club Leicester City on loan until the end of the 2022–23 Women's Super League season.

References 

1999 births
Living people
Sportspeople from Wuppertal
German women's footballers
TSG 1899 Hoffenheim (women) players
FC Bayern Munich (women) players
Leicester City W.F.C. players
Germany women's youth international footballers
Women's association football goalkeepers
Footballers from North Rhine-Westphalia
Expatriate sportspeople in England